The Spanish algyroides, also commonly known as the Spanish keeled lizard or Valverde's lizard, is a species of lizard in the family Lacertidae.

Geographic range
A. hidalgoi is endemic to southeastern Spain.

Habitat

Reproduction
A. hidalgoi is oviparous.

Conservation status
A. hidalgoi is threatened by habitat loss.

References

Further reading
Arnold EN, Burton JA (1978). A Field Guide to the Reptiles and Amphibians of Britain and Europe. London: Collins. 272 pp. + Plates 1-40. . (Algyroides marchi, pp. 118–119 + Plate 18 + Map 59).
Buchholz KF (1965). "Zur Kenntnis des Genus Algyroides (Reptilia: Lacertidae) in Spanien ". Bonner Zoologische Beiträge, Zoologische Forschunginstitut und Museum Alexander Koenig, Bonn 15: 239-246. (Algyroides marchi, pp. 243–244). (in German).
Valverde JA (1958). "Una nueva lagartija del género Algiroides Bribron [sic] procedente de la Sierra de Cazorla (Sur de España)". Archivos del Instituto de Aclimatación de Almería 7: 127-134. (Algiroides marchi, new species). (in Spanish).

Algyroides
Endemic reptiles of the Iberian Peninsula
Endemic fauna of Spain
Reptiles described in 1916
Taxa named by Eduardo Boscá
Taxonomy articles created by Polbot